Fayetteville is a city in Fayette County, Texas. The population was 246 at the 2020 census.

History
The town is located in an area that was originally granted to Alex Thompson and George Cumberland.  Fayetteville's first immigrant settlers were the families headed by John Crier, James Cummins, and James J. Ross, three of the Old Three Hundred. The settlement began at the location of a stagecoach stop on an old road between San Felipe and Bastrop.

Even though Fayette County was named after General Lafayette, the Revolutionary War hero, the community was named in 1844 after Fayetteville, North Carolina, for a prominent citizen of the time, who had surveyed the community, named its streets, and donated lots for the Fayetteville Academy and the town's multidenominational Union Church.
 
Fayetteville was incorporated in 1882.

The town made national news during World War I. As reprinted by Stars and Stripes in its March 15, 1918 issue, the town's mayor, W. C. Langlotz, and ten of the town's citizens were charged with espionage. They were arrested following the display of the flag of the German Empire over the entryway of the Germania club in Fayetteville. The group pleaded "not guilty": the mayor said the flag had been displayed by mistake.

The majority of the area within the town boundaries was designated the Fayetteville Historic District and listed on the National Register of Historic Places on July 10, 2008.

Geography

Fayetteville is located in eastern Fayette County at  (29.904922, –96.675119).

Demographics

As of the census of 2000, there were 261 people, 120 households, and 71 families residing in the city. The population density was 602.4 people per square mile (234.4/km2). There were 183 housing units at an average density of 422.4/sq mi (164.3/km2). The racial makeup of the city was 96.55% White, 3.07% African American, and 0.38% Asian. Hispanic or Latino of any race were 1.53% of the population.

There were 120 households, out of which 20.8% had children under the age of 18 living with them, 48.3% were married couples living together, 10.8% had a female householder with no husband present, and 40.8% were non-families. 35.8% of all households were made up of individuals, and 24.2% had someone living alone who was 65 years of age or older. The average household size was 2.17 and the average family size was 2.89.

In the city, the population was spread out, with 19.5% under the age of 18, 7.7% from 18 to 24, 20.7% from 25 to 44, 24.5% from 45 to 64, and 27.6% who were 65 years of age or older. The median age was 46 years. For every 100 females, there were 74.0 males. For every 100 females age 18 and over, there were 72.1 males.

The median income for a household in the city was $27,639, and the median income for a family was $31,667. Males had a median income of $26,250 versus $18,125 for females. The per capita income for the city was $13,916. About 8.0% of families and 13.2% of the population were below the poverty line, including 37.5% of those under the age of eighteen and 12.7% of those 65 or over.

Education
The city is served by the Fayetteville Independent School District.

References

External links
 City of Fayetteville official website
 Fayetteville Chamber of Commerce
 
 Day trip to Fayetteville, from the February 25, 2000 issue of the Austin Chronicle

Cities in Texas
Cities in Fayette County, Texas